Coleophora assyriae is a moth of the family Coleophoridae.

References

assyriae
Moths described in 1994